Probabilistic design is a discipline within engineering design. It deals primarily with the consideration of the effects of random variability upon the performance of an engineering system during the design phase. Typically, these effects are related to quality and reliability. Thus, probabilistic design is a tool that is mostly used in areas that are  concerned with quality and reliability. For example, product design, quality control, systems engineering, machine design, civil engineering (particularly useful in limit state design) and manufacturing. It differs from the classical approach to design by assuming a small probability of failure instead of using the safety factor.

Designer's perspective

When using a probabilistic approach to design, the designer no longer thinks of each variable as a single value or number. Instead, each variable is viewed as a probability distribution. From this perspective, probabilistic design predicts the flow of variability (or distributions) through a system. By considering this flow, a designer can make adjustments to reduce the flow of random variability, and improve quality. Proponents of the approach contend that many quality problems can be predicted and rectified during the early design stages and at a much reduced cost.

The objective of probabilistic design
Typically, the goal of probabilistic design is to identify the design that will exhibit the smallest effects of random variability. This could be the one design option out of several that is found to be most robust. Alternatively, it could be the only design option available, but with the optimum combination of input variables and parameters. This second approach is sometimes referred to as robustification, parameter design or design for six sigma

Methods used
Essentially, probabilistic design focuses upon the prediction of the effects of random variability. Some methods that are used to predict the random variability of an output include:

the Monte Carlo method (including Latin hypercubes);
propagation of error;
design of experiments (DOE)
the method of moments
Statistical interference
quality function deployment
Failure mode and effects analysis

See also
 Interval finite element

Footnotes

References
 Ang and Tang (2006) Probability Concepts in Engineering: Emphasis on Applications to Civil and Environmental Engineering. John Wiley & Sons. 
 Ash (1993) The Probability Tutoring Book: An Intuitive Course for Engineers and Scientists (and Everyone Else). Wiley-IEEE Press. 
 Clausing (1994) Total Quality Development: A Step-By-Step Guide to World-Class Concurrent Engineering. American Society of Mechanical Engineers. 
 Haugen (1980) Probabilistic mechanical design. Wiley. 
 Papoulis (2002) Probability, Random Variables and Stochastic Process. McGraw-Hill Publishing Co. 
 Siddall (1982) Optimal Engineering Design. CRC. 
 Dodson, B., Hammett, P., and Klerx, R. (2014) Probabilistic Design for Optimization and Robustness for Engineers John Wiley & Sons, Inc. 
 Cederbaum G.,  Elishakoff I.,  Aboudi J. and Librescu L., Random Vibration and Reliability of Composite Structures, Technomic, Lancaster, 1992, XIII + pp. 191; 
 Elishakoff I., Probabilistic Methods in the Theory of Structures: Random Strength of Materials, Random Vibration, and Buckling, World Scientific, Singapore, 2017

External links
  Probabilistic design
 Non Deterministic Approaches in Engineering

Engineering statistics
Design
Quality